Adrián "Adri" Embarba Blázquez (born 7 May 1992) is a Spanish professional footballer who plays for UD Almería as a right winger.

Club career

Early career
Born in Madrid, Embarba finished his development with local Getafe CF after youth spells with neighbouring Real Madrid and RSD Alcalá. He made his senior debut in the 2011–12 season with CD Marchamalo in Castile-La Mancha, scoring six goals in the Tercera División. 

Embarba signed with RCD Carabanchel in June 2012.

Rayo Vallecano
In July 2013, Embarba joined Rayo Vallecano, being assigned to the reserves also in the fourth tier. He made his first-team – and La Liga – debut on 30 August, coming off the bench for injured Iago Falque and playing 65 minutes in a 1–2 home defeat against Levante UD.

On 12 June 2014, Embarba signed a new three-year deal with Rayo, being definitely promoted to the main squad. He scored his first professional goal on 14 March of the following year, the last in the 3–1 win over Granada CF also at the Campo de Fútbol de Vallecas.

Embarba contributed two goals in 28 appearances during the 2015–16 campaign, as the club suffered relegation. On 8 October 2017, he scored a brace in a 4–1 Segunda División home rout of Real Valladolid.

On 19 December 2017, after establishing himself as a regular starter, Embarba renewed his contract until 2021. He achieved promotion to the top flight in 2017–18, scoring a career-best eight times in the process and adding 14 assists.

Espanyol
Embarba transferred to RCD Espanyol on 23 January 2020, after his €10 million release clause was paid. After being relegated in his first season, he helped his side to return to the main division in the second by scoring nine goals.

Embarba featured much less in 2021–22 (also failing to find the net), mainly due to a run-in with manager Vicente Moreno early into the campaign.

Almería
On 24 August 2022, Embarba moved to UD Almería, newly-promoted to the top tier.

Personal life
Embarba's cousin, Isaac, is also a footballer. A midfielder, he also played for Rayo.

Honours
Rayo Vallecano
Segunda División: 2017–18

Espanyol
Segunda División: 2020–21

Notes

References

External links

1992 births
Living people
Spanish footballers
Footballers from Madrid
Association football wingers
La Liga players
Segunda División players
Tercera División players
RSD Alcalá players
Rayo Vallecano B players
Rayo Vallecano players
RCD Espanyol footballers
UD Almería players